Ian Whitten (born 5 June 1987) is an Irish rugby union player for Exeter in Premiership Rugby. He was capped by Ireland on their 2009 tour to North America when he lined out against Canada on 23 May 2009. He plays as a centre.

Ulster

A former pupil of Wallace High School, Whitten was recruited to the Phoenix Ulster Rugby Academy in 2007, having already represented Ireland at U18 and U19 levels.

The 2008-9 season was the real breakthrough season for Whitten with his first senior Ulster cap coming against Stade Francais in the Heineken Cup and he went on to establish himself in the side for the rest of the season. This culminated in a call-up to the Ireland squad for the summer tour of USA and Canada, where he won two senior caps.

Exeter Chiefs

It was announced on 8 March 2012 that Whitten would be joining English Premiership Rugby side Exeter Chiefs for the 2012-2013 season. Whitten was involved in 16 games in his debut season with the Chiefs and was also involved in the Chiefs maiden Heineken Cup campaign. Whitten established himself as a strong contender in the centers for the Chiefs with his good lines of running and strong defensive play. He started the final as Exeter Chiefs defeated Wasps to be crowned champions of the 2016-17 English Premiership.

References

External links
 Exeter Chiefs Player Profile
 Aviva Premiership Player Profile
 RaboDirectPRO12 Player Profile

1987 births
Living people
Ulster Rugby players
Ireland international rugby union players
People educated at Wallace High School, Lisburn
Lisburn Cricket Club players
Rugby union centres